Deria Sugulle Ainanshe was a Somali ruler and the 2nd Sultan of the Habr Yunis Sultanate, reigning from the late-eighteenth to the mid-nineteenth century.

Biography

Deria was the second Sultan of the Habr Yunis who came from a lineage of tribal chiefs. His father, Sugulle, was first Sultan of the Habr Yunis and his Grandfather, Ainanshe, was the tribe's Chieftain. The earliest recorded mention of Deria is from 1840 by French Explorer Antoine Thomson d'Abbadie. The Sultan had his capital at Waram or 'Wadhan' in Togdheer just northwest of Burao and its important wells. Caravans would pass Waram en route to Berbera through the Sheikh pass and Deria would collect tax and administer affairs of the Habr Yunis from the town.

Lieutenant C.P Rigby in the year 1841 writes:

The Hubr Gajis tribe and its different branches are governed by two Sultans, named Sultan Deriah [Habr Yunis Sultan] and Sultan Farah [Eidagale Sultan]: the residence of the latter is at Toro.

Enrico Baudi i Vesme who visited Burao in 1898 writes:

The chief of the Habr Junis lineage, named Hainasce [Ainashe], had seventeen children, one of whom his name was Soghulli [Sugulleh]. First they stayed together, then they separated, forming one Rer Soghulli, who are the most numerous, the other sixteen children together, the Baha Hainasce.

Drake Brockman in his book British Somaliland published in 1912 writes:

Deriyeh, the head of the Rer Segulleh, was universally proclaimed Sultan by the rest of the Habr Yunis tribe...Sultan Deriyeh lived to a great age, and had no less than eighteen sons, of whom the first two were borne to him by a woman of the Makahil section of the Habr Awal tribe, and the elder of these, Aman by name, joining with his brother, formed the Ba Maka-hil, while his remaining sixteen stepbrothers formed the Baha Deriyeh. Aman had ten sons, the eldest of whom was Ahmed, who died before his father, who himself died before his old father, the aged Sultan Deriyeh. Now, as soon as Sultan Deriyeh died there was trouble as to his successor.

Reer Deria Sugulle sub-clans

Deria's wives were Awraleh, Madedo, Ebleh, Mardal and a fifth woman of the Habr Awal Makahil, these five wives would bore him a total of eighteen sons who would later on form the Baha Deria and Ba Makahil sub clans.

Jama Deria
Hirsi Deria (Father of Sultan Madar)
Aadan Deria
Ali Deria
Abdullah Deria
Yusuf Deria
Samatar Deria
Ahmed Deria
Mahmud Deria
Ismail Deria
Egal Deria
Hussein Deria
Nur Deria
Awad Deria (Sultan Awad)
Abokor Deria
Cismaan Deria
Guuleed Deria
Ammaan Deria (Reer Ammaan)
Axmed Amaan (father of Sultan Nur)
Ismaaciil Amaan
Hersi Aman (Sultan Hersi Aman)
Hayd Amaan
Yey Amaan
Magan Amaan
Ali Amaan
Fidhin Amaan
Muhumed Amaan
Guled Amaan

See also
Farah Guled contemporary of Deria and 2nd Grand Sultan of the Isaaq
Hassan Farah contemporary of Deria and 3rd Grand Sultan of Isaaq
Somali aristocratic and court titles

References

Sunni monarchs
18th-century Somalian people
19th-century Somalian people
Somali sultans
Somalian Sunni Muslims
Somalian Muslims
Year of birth missing